Qarah Qush or Qareh Qush or Qarehqush, also rendered as Qara Kush, may refer to:
 Qarah Qush-e Olya
 Qarah Qush-e Sofla